David Vernon "D. J." Reader Jr. (born July 1, 1994) is an American football defensive tackle for the Cincinnati Bengals of the National Football League (NFL). He played college football at Clemson.

College career
Reader played football and baseball at Clemson University. Reader was a pitcher for Tigers baseball in its 2013 season.

Professional career

Houston Texans
Reader was selected by the Houston Texans in the fifth round (166th overall) of the 2016 NFL Draft. He started seven games in his rookie year logging one sack, seven solo tackles and 15 assisted tackles.

In 2017, Reader replaced the retired Vince Wilfork as the Texans starting nose tackle. He started the first 14 games of the season before being placed on injured reserve on December 19, 2017.

On September 9, 2018 during the 2018 Season opener against the New England Patriots, Reader had the first multi sack game of his career with 2 on Tom Brady.

In week 3 of the 2019 season against the Los Angeles Chargers, Reader recorded 1.5 sacks on Philip Rivers in the 27-20 win.

Cincinnati Bengals
On April 2, 2020, Reader signed a four-year, $53 million contract with the Cincinnati Bengals. He was placed on injured reserve on October 12, 2020 with a quad injury.

In Reader's second season with the Bengals, the team won three playoff games to reach Super Bowl LVI. Reader recorded a sack in a 23-20 loss to the Los Angeles Rams.

Reader suffered a knee injury in Week 3 of the 2022 season and was placed on injured reserve on September 29, 2022. He was activated on November 19, and played in each of the team's remaining seven regular season games, all victories. Cincinnati won the AFC North with a 12-4 record and entered the postseason on an eight-game winning streak. Reader recorded two solo tackles in the team's 24-17 win over the Baltimore Ravens in the Wild Card Round, and another two tackles (one solo) in a 27-10 win over the Buffalo Bills in the Divisional Round.

Personal life
Reader's father died from kidney failure on June 30, 2014.

Reader has one son, born in November 2019.

References

External links
Houston Texans bio
Clemson Tigers bio

1994 births
Living people
Players of American football from Greensboro, North Carolina
American football defensive tackles
Clemson Tigers baseball players
Clemson Tigers football players
Houston Texans players
Cincinnati Bengals players
Ed Block Courage Award recipients
Grimsley High School alumni